Julien Prosser (born 11 June 1972 in Bunbury, Western Australia) is a male beach volleyball player who represented Australia in three consecutive Summer Olympics, starting in 1996.

Australia's most successful player ever, Three Olympic Games – Atlanta (9th), Sydney (9th) and Athens (4th), 144 FIVB World Tour events and winning 14 Australian National Titles, playing more international beach volleyball games than anyone in the world.

References
 Profile at the Beach Volleyball Database

1972 births
Living people
Australian men's beach volleyball players
Olympic beach volleyball players of Australia
Beach volleyball players at the 1996 Summer Olympics
Beach volleyball players at the 2000 Summer Olympics
Beach volleyball players at the 2004 Summer Olympics
People from Bunbury, Western Australia
People educated at Rossmoyne Senior High School